Yoganand Shastri (born 17 April 1944) is an Indian politician from Delhi. He thrice served as member of Delhi Legislative Assembly. He also served as the Speaker of Delhi Legislative Assembly from 2008 to 2013. He was a cabinet minister for Development, Food and Civil Supplies in First Dikshit cabinet and Minister for Health and Social Welfare in Second Dikshit cabinet. He twice represented Malviya Nagar Assembly constituency and one time Mehrauli Assembly constituency. He entered the Nationalist Congress Party in November 2021 in the presence of party chief Sharad Pawar.

Position held

Electoral Performances

References

 पूर्व विधानसभा अध्यक्ष का नौकर छेड़छाड़ में गिरफ्तार
 Dikshit criticises BJP for demanding Speaker`s res
 Dr Yoganand Shastri: Congress (Malviya Nagar)

Living people
Indian National Congress politicians from Delhi
1944 births
Speakers of the Delhi Legislative Assembly
Delhi MLAs 1998–2003
Delhi MLAs 2003–2008
Delhi MLAs 2008–2013